Mary I of England was crowned at Westminster Abbey on Sunday 1 October 1553. This was the first coronation of a queen regnant in England, a female ruler in her own right. The ceremony was therefore transformed. Ritual and costume was interlinked. Contemporary records insist the proceedings were performed "according to the precedents", but mostly these were provisions made previously for queens-consort.

Proclamation and the Oration gratulatory
Mary was proclaimed as Queen on 19 July 1553 by William Herbert, Earl of Pembroke, setting aside the claims of Lady Jane Grey.

Richard Taverner wrote an Oration gratulatory made upon the joyfull proclayming of the most noble Princes Quene Mary Quene of Englande, a pamphlet published by John Day describing the legitimacy of Mary's succession. Writers addressed the challenges to rule that Mary had overcome. Thomas Watertoune published a ballad, An Invective against Treason, and a ballad by Leonard Stopes compared her bloodless struggle to the biblical stories of Judith and Holofernes and Esther and Haman.

There was no English publication describing the coronation ceremony. A narrative description of the coronation was published in Italian and Spanish versions. These texts have many similarities with descriptions produced by diplomats. A Spanish narrative also gave an estimated cost of all the coronation events at 100,000 ducats.

Plays and drama at the coronation

The revels accounts include fabric for costumes for a play to be performed during Mary's coronation feasts, which included a good and a bad angel with a personification of the Genus Humanum. The troubles of the human race, Scarcity, Sickness, Feebleness and Deformity, were countered by Reason, Plenty, Verity, Self-Love, and Care. These were probably understood as virtues residing in Mary's court and realm. No text of this morality play has yet been identified. Mary made a warrant for the fabrics to Edward Waldegrave, Master of the Royal Wardrobe. His wife Frances dressed Mary after her anointing as queen.

There is some doubt as to whether the Genus Humanum play was performed at the coronation. Mary gave Thomas Cawarden a warrant for performing a play at the coronation on 26 September, while she was at St James' Palace. The accounts for making the costumes include a note that the performance was deferred until Christmas.

An anonymously authored play, Respublica, written for performance at Christmas presented some of issues in 1553 relating to Mary's accession and her relationship with Parliament. Respublica has sometimes been attributed to Nicholas Udall, but its authorship and connection to court revels is disputed. In the play, Mary is honoured as "Verity, the daughter of sage old Father Time". This echoes a motto used by Mary, Veritas Filia Temporis. The idea was of a "Truth" in opposition to Protestant reformers.

Royal Entry to London

Mary had been at Kenninghall in Norfolk and Framlingham in Suffolk. At Ipswich children presented her with a golden heart. She met her sister Elizabeth at Wanstead. Mary rode into London on 3 August 1553, in procession. On this occasion, according to Estienne Perlin, she wore violet velvet, "velours violet". Wriothesley says she changed her clothes in a house in Whitechapel, to a rich apparel of "purple velvet French fashion, with sleeves of the same, her kirtle of purple satin all thick set with goldsmith work and great pearl, with her foresleeves of the same set with rich stones". On this occasion, she entered the city at Aldgate. She would make a formal Royal Entry or procession through the city on 30 September as a preliminary to her coronation.

Coronation eve
Mary left St James' Palace by barge for the Tower of London on 28 September 1553. The wardrobe accounts include sumptuous costume for Mary and her ladies for the reception on the "eve" of the coronation. Mary's robe and mantle were of gold and silver tissue. The phrase refers to a ceremony before the coronation when the Knights of the Bath made their preparations and bathed, which took place "according to the old usage of England" at the Tower of London on 29 September. In the morning new knights were dubbed in the queen's chamber of presence by the Earl of Arundel, steward of the queen's household. He was given Mary's commission to make knights on this occasion.

Edward VI's coronation accounts also include payments for a robe and mantle to wear at the creation of the Knights of the Bath.<ref>Maria Hayward, Dress at the Court of Henry VIII (Maney, 2007), p. 224.</ref> The costume historian Janet Arnold proposed that Mary's tissue clothes were re-used by Elizabeth I at her coronation, after alterations, and may be depicted in a coronation portrait of Elizabeth.

The coronation entry
Mary made her Royal Entry on 30 September in the afternoon. She came from the Tower in a chariot or litter to the Palace of Westminster. Princess Elizabeth and Anne of Cleves rode in another litter. According to the French ambassador Antoine de Noailles and other diplomats, they were dressed in cloth of silver with robes or gowns in the French fashion. Four ladies in waiting rode on horseback beside the litter, the Duchess of Norfolk, the Marchioness of Exeter, the Marchioness of Winchester, and the Countess of Arundel. The third chariot carried six ladies in waiting accompanied by ten ladies in crimson velvet riding on horseback including Mary Finch.

More noblewomen and gentlewomen dressed in crimson satin followed on horseback with the maids of honour, including Anne Basset, Anne Dormer, and the Mother of the Maids, Mistress Bayneham, or, according to some sources, Mistress Poyntz, or Mistress Morris. With the maids, riding behind the three litters, were the serving gentlewomen known as chamberers, dressed in crimson damask. There were between 46 and 60 female riders in total. The windows of houses were decorated with tapestry or cloth of gold and cloth of silver. 

There were pageants with music and speeches. At Fenchurch Street, Genoese merchants staged a welcome salutation given by a young actor portraying a girl in a chair or throne suspended in the air. There were four giants. Latin inscriptions on the triumphal arches were recorded by Giovanni Francesco Commendone, a Papal diplomat, and the French ambassador Noailles.

Hanse merchants made their pageant at Gracechurch Corner, with a mount and fountain running with wine. and an actor "flied down a rope" as the queen passed by. At the other end of the street, the Florentine merchants had built an arch with three entries, six actors above welcomed Mary, and on top a statue of an angel dressed in green appeared to play a trumpet. This pageant depicted Queen Tomyris and Judith, and seems to have celebrated Mary's recent triumph over the Duke of Northumberland. At St Paul's Cathedral, "Peter, a Dutchman", danced with streamers on the steeple.

Coronation

On 1 October, Mary arrived by barge at the privy stairs of the Old Palace of Westminster. As Mary walked from Westminster Hall to the Abbey in the morning, three naked swords were carried before her. Two represented Justice, Spiritual justice, and Temporal justice. The third sword, the curtana, was carried by the Earl of Derby and represented Mercy. The great bearing sword was refurbished by the cutler John Ailande. Anne of Cleves and Princess Elizabeth attended Mary as she processed into the Abbey. Countesses and noblewomen walked in pairs, holding their coronets.

Mary's train was carried by the Lord Chamberlain, John Gage, and the Duchess of Norfolk. The quire of the Abbey was hung with tapestry and the floor was strewn with rushes. When Mary entered the Abbey, the Bishop declared the Queen's pardon for prisoners, excluding those in the Tower of London and some in the Marshalsea. The exceptions included those who had supported Lady Jane Grey.

The mount and St Edward's chair
Mary was led to King Edward's chair by two noblemen. After a short repose, she was joined by Stephen Gardiner, Bishop of Winchester and Lord Chancellor, on the raised scaffold or mount in sight of the people. The chair was at the centre of the mount, draped with rich fabrics. On the back of the "white chair" were two carved lions on the corner posts and a fleur-de-lis topping the centre. Mary showed herself at the four corners of the mount.

From the mount, Gardiner introduced Mary as queen, a part of the ceremony known as "recognition". Edward VI had been carried to the corners of his dais on a little chair by ushers. The ushers who guarded Mary's chair were Masters George Tyrrel, John Norris, Dauncey and Lyggens, men who served as daily waiters in the queen's household. Norris later compiled a treatise on ceremonial for Gentlemen Ushers.

Gardiner asked for the people's assent, and they cried out in one voice "God save Queen Mary".

The traverse
Mary then went to a richly draped chair at the high altar and made her offerings. George Day, Bishop of Chichester gave a sermon on the theme of obedience. Mary made her oaths, and the choir sang Veni Creator Spiritus. When Mary was to be anointed, according to some accounts, she went into a "traverse" on the right hand side of the high altar and was undressed by ladies of privy chamber. A traverse is usually a space curtained off under a canopy. A Spanish account calls it un lugar apartado, a space apart. It has been suggested that the traverse was located in St Edward's Chapel.

Mary was dressed in a different costume and, putting aside the mantle, was anointed by Stephen Gardiner within the traverse. Holy oil had been obtained by the Imperial ambassador Simon Renard from the Bishop of Arras. The stock of oil left over from the Protestant reign of Edward VI was considered unhallowed. William Paget, 1st Baron Paget and three other barons held silver staves supporting a "paill" or canopy over her during the anointing. The canopy was to be made of gold "cloth of baudekin" lined with silk sarsenet, but crimson satin embroidered with gold was used instead.

Three crowns and two sceptres
The Duke of Norfolk brought the three crowns, St Edward's Crown, the Imperial crown, and a crown newly made for Mary. Gardiner crowned Mary three times. He gave her a ring for her "marrying finger" and the Master of the Jewelhouse brought a pair of bracelets set with precious stones and pearls. The noblemen now put on their caps and coronets, which they had carried into the church.

Gardiner and the earls made homage to Mary. Mass was celebrated while Mary remained kneeling. She held the royal sceptre, which had been carried by the Earl of Arundel, and the consort's sceptre which was topped with a dove.Arthur Collins, Jewels and Plate of Elizabeth I (London, 1955), pp. 14, 268. She entered the curtained traverse and reappeared in her coronation robe, carrying the sceptre and monde or orb. The ceremony in the Abbey was then complete and had lasted until nearly four or five o'clock.

Banquet in Westminster Hall
After the ceremonies, there was a banquet in Westminster Hall. According to the diplomat Simon Renard, Mary sat in the Coronation Chair with the Stone of Scone in the hall and rested her feet on two of her ladies in waiting.

The champion
The Queen's Champion, Edward Dymoke, rode into the hall in full armour. He threw down a glove and offered to challenge any who questioned Mary's right to rule.

Dymoke's fee was a gold cup, which Mary passed to him filled with wine. He was also given the horse and armour, 18 yards of crimson satin for livery clothes, and the food allowance of a baron. Dymoke made a claim in November for a few weapons and a pair of gilt spurs which he had not yet received.

Costume
Details of fabrics bought or supplied for the coronation are known from records of the royal wardrobe and Mary's warrants or orders. There is also a list of fabrics and items with the order of ceremony prepared by the wardrobe. Chronicle accounts and diplomatic dispatches also describe some textiles and costume. The costume historian Janet Arnold published some of the wardrobe documents. The ambassador Noailles wrote in August that Mary had put aside a "superstition" of the court of Edward VI and now her women wore brightly coloured clothes and jewellery, with wide sleeves in the French fashion. In 1554, a Venetian diplomat, Giacomo Soranzo, reported that Mary wore on state occasions a gown and bodice, with wide hanging sleeves in the French fashion.

A Genoese merchant wrote that Lady Jane Grey had worn green and white in July 1553, Tudor colours asserting her right to rule. The variety of sources, and changes of costume made during the ceremony, has led to some confusion over the use of fabrics and colour, and consequent symbolism. Crimson was a traditional colour for the coronation of English monarchs. At the height of the ceremony, Mary changed into purple, a colour referenced by the writer John Seton.

Two squires of honour at the Entry and coronation wore mantles of crimson velvet, worn baldric-wise off the shoulder, and hats of crimson tissue. They represented the Duchy of Gascony and Guyenne. Described in narratives as gentlemen wearing ducal robes, their presence represented Mary's claim to these territories. At the coronation of Edward VI these roles had been performed by two Gentleman Ushers, John Norris and William Rainsford. Their hats and costume, as described at the coronation of Anne Boleyn, were deliberately old-fashioned in style.

According to a chronicle, Mary wore a gown of blue velvet lined with powdered ermine on her way to the Abbey. She owned a blue velvet gown at this time. Other accounts say that she wore her Parliament robes of crimson velvet. A manuscript listing her clothes for the day gives other details, and says that she wore her "common usual apparel" to go to her coronation at Westminster on the second day beneath her Parliament robes. Her collar was decorated with passamayne lace of Venice gold. Passamayne was a kind of braid or woven lace, used as edging on garments or on the borders of skirts.

Circlet
On her head, Mary wore the gold circlet studded with precious stones and pearls which she had worn on the previous day during her Royal Entry into the city of London. The image of Mary holding her heavy circlet and jewelled veil or "caul" with difficulty during the Entry, as found in the chronicles, may have originated with her enemies. This circlet was newly made for Mary.

Blue and ray cloth
The route from Westminster Hall into the Abbey was spread with blue velvet or multi-coloured woollen "ray-cloth". The wardrobe account says the blue cloth was used between the hall and the Abbey quire door. Cloth used at the coronation of Anne Boleyn was described as "blue ray cloth". The pulpit was draped with red worsted.

Anointing and a change of costume

During the ceremony Mary withdrew into a traverse, a curtained space, using for robing and disrobing. There she changed into a purple velvet mantle, and a purple velvet kirtle with a train furred with ermine, assisted by her ladies in waiting. Mary was partly undressed for her anointing, during which she wore the Colobium Sindonis of silk taffeta. The newly made silk garment was described as a "tabard of white tarteryn", like that used at the coronation of her parents Henry VIII and Catherine of Aragon in 1509, or of white "sarsenet", worn over her gown. After the anointing, she put on a purple velvet kirtle. Mistress Walgrave, (the wife of Edward Waldegrave), laced up her clothes, and Mary put on a mantle again. Lace with tags were provided for the kirtles and 24 yards of ribbon for girdles. Walgrave also handed linen gloves to the queen. Her shoes were "sabatons" of crimson cloth of gold lined with satin and dressed with Venice gold ribbon or gold passamyne lace. The costume change was detailed in a schedule which describes this specially made "coronation mantle" and its lacework overmantle. This second mantle was mentioned in the published Spanish narrative accounts.

Mary paid for the making of these new items furred with ermine and decorated with Venice gold lace, including the coronation mantle, from her own purse. The earls and countesses in attendance wore crimson velvet and gold coronets.

Gentlewomen and chamberers

The ladies of Mary's household were dressed in three kinds of fabric, according to status, wearing at the Royal Entry crimson damask, satin, and velvet. Holinshed says the clothes of the riders at the Entry and their caparisons were of crimson satin. Wardrobe accounts mention crimson velvet and crimson satin gowns for women for the eve'' of the Coronation.

At the coronation, according to the French ambassador Noailles, the three grades of cloth worn were scarlet (a woollen cloth), satin, and crimson velvet. Another narrative says her majesty's ladies in great numbers wore scarlet in the Abbey.

Scarlet gowns furred with "lettice" fur were made "against our coronation" for Susan Clarencieux, Mrs Jerningham (Elizabeth Jerningham, or her niece, later Mary Southwell), Mary Finch, Mistress Russell, Mistress Colborne, Sibilla Penne (a former nurse of Edward VI), and Mistress Sydney (a sister of Henry Sidney). Lettice is a grey weasel fur. The historian John Strype described some members of this group as chamberers and provided a slightly different list of names and ranking, for the riders at the Entry. He includes Jane Dormer and Jane Russell. Further wardrobe records show that Jane Russell (died 1558) was a chamberer at the coronation and was later a gentlewoman of Mary's privy chamber. She was the wife of William Russell, Sergeant of the Wine Cellar, and was to be rewarded for her advocacy of Mary's marriage. 

The warrant also includes costumes of tinsel for Will Somers and "Jane our woman foole". It is not clear if costume ordered for Jane at this time was intended for wearing at the coronation. Jane and Lucretia, a tumbler, had been members of Mary's household in 1542.

Reuse of coronation clothes by Elizabeth I
Several details of Mary's costume, the vocabulary used for fabrics, and the costume changes of Mary's coronation follow closely the order of her parents' coronation in 1509.

When Elizabeth I was crowned in 1559, she reused some of Mary's clothes, The clothes were altered by the tailor Walter Fyshe.

The costume historian Janet Arnold described how items in Elizabeth's inventory correspond with those in Mary's coronation wardrobe accounts, including the cloth of gold and silver mantle and a matching kirtle trimmed with ermine used at the Royal Entry, and the purple velvet mantle, kirtle and surcoat worn in the Abbey after the anointing. One of the documents from 1553 describes the "mantle and kirtle of white cloth of silver, the mantle of estate with a long train, furred through all with powdered ermines and a mantellace of white silk and gold, a kirtle of the same" and the "kirtle of purple velvet with a train, the train furred with ermines, edged about the skirt ... a mantle of the same called a coronation mantle with a long train".

Some of Mary's gowns remained in Elizabeth's wardrobe and were detailed in inventories, including purple gowns and one of crimson satin sewed with pearls and garnets. It was not recorded if any of these were used at Mary's coronation. It has been suggested that Mary wore the crimson satin gown with pearls at her Winchester wedding to Philip of Spain.

References

External links
 Mary I, Westminster Abbey
 'The Iconography of Mary I, England's First Crowned Queen Regnant', Peter Stiffell, Tudor Times
 Mary's warrant for a coronation play, 26 September 1553, Folger Shakespeare Library
 10 facts about Mary I’s coronation, Mary Tudor: Renaissance Queen
 Fragment of a Latin wardrobe account of Mary, BnF Gallica Anglais 176

1553 in England
Mary I of England
Westminster Abbey
Mary I
1553 plays